The men's artistic team all-around competition at the 2022 Mediterranean Games was held on 26 June 2022 at the Olympic Complex Sports Hall.

Qualified teams
The following NOCs competed as a team for the event.

Final
Source:

References

Men's artistic team all-around
2022